Nomads are known as a group of communities who travel from place to place for their livelihood. Some are salt traders, fortune-tellers, conjurers, ayurvedic healers, jugglers, acrobats, actors, story tellers, snake charmers, animal doctors, tattooists, grindstone makers, or basketmakers. Some anthropologists have identified about 8 nomadic groups in India, numbering perhaps 1 million people—around 1.2 percent of the country's billion-plus population. Aparna Rao and Michael Casimir estimated that nomads make up around 7% of the population of India.

The nomadic communities in India can be broadly divided into three groups: hunter gatherers, pastoralists and the peripatetic or non-food producing groups. Among these, peripatetic nomads are the most neglected and discriminated social group in India. They have lost their livelihood because of drastic changes in transport, industries, production, entertainment and distribution systems. They find pastures for their herders.

Historic development 

Nomadic tribes have always been a source of suspicion to sedentary people. In the colonial period, the British normalized a set of notions about such groups that echoed European ideas about the gypsies, whose origins are in the Indian subcontinent. They listed such groups that posed a ‘threat’ to settled society and introduced a legislative measure, the Criminal Tribes Act (CTA) in 1871 and as a result of which nearly 200 such communities stood ‘notified’ as criminal.

The Targalas or Nayaks have been itinerant drama troupes in Gujarat who moved from village to village to perform ‘Bhavai’, a folk dance theatre form. These performers too carry the stigma of criminality. There are numerous folk tales of ‘the skillful thefts’ allegedly committed by Bhavai troupe members. And if a burglary had taken place in a village where Bhavai had been performed, members of the troupe would be arrested and interrogated. The itinerant Bhavai players have always been expected to report their entry, stay and exit to the village headman.

The folk-dance drama of Bhavai probably originated in Kutch, North Gujarat. It then spread over other parts of Gujarat, Saurashtra, Kutch and Marvad (now Rajasthan). It has been a popular form of entertainment among the rural and the townsfolk from the 14th century through to the 19th century in the North-west region of India. Although its origin is in the worship of the Mother Goddess, Bhavani, it has gathered secular elements with the passage of time and come to embrace the whole range of human emotions of the rural community. It is to Gujarat what Yakshagana is to Karnataka, Nautanki to Uttar Pradesh, Tamasha and Lalit to Maharashtra—a veritable folk-dance drama.

The performing Targalas are believed to be the descendants of the poet Asait Thakar of Unjha who lived in the 14th century. As the legend goes, Asait was an Audichya Brahmin of Unjha in North Gujarat. His host Hemala Patel's daughter Ganga was kidnapped by a Rawal Ratan Singh, Sardar Jahan Roz. Hemala Patel urged Asait Thakar to use his artistic skills to help liberate his daughter from the Sardar. Asait told the Sardar, after pleasing him with his performance and songs that he should liberate the girl, who he claimed was his.

Indian distinguished from other nomads in India in that they breed animals, and this distinguishes them from other groups that which make a living by combining with other itinerant professions such as blacksmithing by Gadia Lohar or selling salt by the Lambadi. These pastoral groups are concentrated in certain regions such as the semi-arid and arid Thar desert region and the neighbouring salt marshes of Kutch along the Indo-Pakistan border, the alpine and sub-alpine zones above 3200 metres in the Himalayas forming the states of Jammu and Kashmir, Himachal Pradesh and Uttarakhand.

Types of livestock kept in mobile pastoral systems include buffaloes, sheep, goats, camels, cattle, donkeys, and yaks among others. Unlike in the Middle East, where pastoralist are organized in tribes occupying distinct areas, in India pastoralist are integrated in the caste system, representing endogamous social units specialising in animal husbandry.

In western India in the Kutch region, there is a group of pastoral nomads known as the Maldhari. The word Maldhari means in the local Kutchi language means an "owner of animal stock".

Peripatetic nomads 

Throughout South Asia, there are groups of nomads who are peddlers, itinerant minstrels, dancers and dramatists. These peripatetic nomads do not constitute a monolithic groups, but includes numerous groups often refer to themselves as jatis or quoms.

See also 

 Nomadic tribes in India

References

Dom in India

India
Pastoralists
Romani in India
Scheduled Tribes of India
Denotified tribes of India
Social groups of India